Květa Peschke and Rennae Stubbs were the defending champions, but lost in the first round to Anna-Lena Grönefeld and Patty Schnyder.

Cara Black and Liezel Huber won in the final 6–1, 7–6(3), against Anna-Lena Grönefeld and Patty Schnyder.

Seeds

Draw

Draw

External links
Draw

Doubles
Zurich Open